Das schwarze Schaf   is a 1944 German/Czechoslovak film, directed by Miroslav Cikán. It stars  Victor Janson, Albert Johannes, and Lotte Koch.

References

External links
 

1944 films
Films of Nazi Germany
1940s German-language films
Films directed by Miroslav Cikán
Czech black-and-white films
German black-and-white films
Czechoslovak black-and-white films
1940s Czech films